Akash Bhairav or Aaju is one of the different forms of Bhairava. 

The temple of Akash Bhairav is supposed to have been a palace of the king of Nepal, Kiranti King Yalambar around 3100–3500 years back. The surrounding of Akash Bhairav is known as Yen to symbolize Ne of Nepal. Ne means Midland in Kiranti language. The head of the Aakash Bhairav was dug up several hundred years ago in Kathmandu. It is taken out once a year on the occasion of Yenya Festival and blessed by the Kumari, the living goddess who lives in the nearby Kumarichok. This ceremony is held in the month of August/September. During the ceremony, large number of worshippers come to visit this temple. They offer Peda (sweets made from milk), flowers, money and several others things. We could have witnessed the late dynasty exchanging the swords with that of Akash Bhairav, most recently by the previous king Gyanendra of Nepal and late King Birendra of Nepal before him. In reality, they had made the offering and shown deep respect towards the historic icon.

Other names 
He is also known as King Yalambar in Nepal,and Āaju meaning First King in Nepal Bhasa.

History of the Deity
The Akash Bhairab is said to be the Kirati king Yalambar himself. Legend has it that, Yalambar was the first king to establish this nation and even extended towards Tista in east and Trishuli in the west. He is believed to have gained the powers through tantric worshipping. During the famous battle of the Mahabharat, the first king of Kirat dynasty, Yalambar in disguise of Bhairab, went to the battlefield to help the losing party. When Lord Krishna heard of it, he tried to test the ability of Bhairab, turned out that if Bhairab was to be allowed to join the losing side, the war would continue till both parties were to be annihilated, for whichever side Bhairab will have overwhelming advantage that the arrow, Bhairab (Yalamber is kirat king, and kirats are known to be great hunters whose primary weapon is bow and arrow) possessed could even penetrate the body of Krishna who is considered divinity. So Krishna asked Bhairab if Bhairab could give something as gift, for Bhairav is/was the greatest of all warrior in the gathering of Mahabharata, as Bhairav agreed, Krishna asked or the head of Bhairab and he promptly chopped Yalambar's head, which reached Kathmandu through the sky, hence the name given to the sky god or the Akash Bhairab.

Iconography
Aakash Bhairav has often been depicted in Buddhist iconography by a large blue head with a fierce face, huge silver eyes and a crown of skulls and serpents. The deity head resides on a silver throne that is carried by lions, accompanied by Bhimsen (Bhima) and Bhadrakali on either side. The idol face is understood to represent the mask that King Yalamber wore on his way to the Kurukshetra. The Indrachok idol is somewhat milder in demeanor than many of the Buddhist idols.

Lord Aakash Bhairav, the 'god of the sky', is also regarded by Nepalese as a progenitor of the Maharjan caste, especially the peasant groups. Pictured on Aakash Bhairav's head is an image that the Buddhists identify as Buddha, and the Hindus identify as Brahma, thus making the idol of Yalamber/Aakash Bhairav worshipped by all.

Worship
The traditional Akash Bhairav Puja is accompanied by Upasana and Anusthan. Sacred water, sandalwood, flowers, fruits, incense, and naibedya are some of the offerings for this ceremony. Legend has it that worship of the Bhairav is usually a mark of safety and strength. In the Nepali imagination, the Akash Bhairav symbolizes protection and goodwill for the nation and its people.

Religion, nation, people, belief, faith and traditional thanksgiving are all interwoven in this manifestation of Bhairav worship. The Akash Bhairav is also believed to be the Jeevan-Tatwa. Culturalism is seen in Bhairav worship and the temple itself. It stands as a grand testament to a cultural personification of Upasamhar. For eight days during the Indra Jatra, celebrations in the temple consist of adorning the temple and the deity. This is followed by the Tantrik Puja, the Sagun Puja, and the Kal Puja. The worshipper and the deity are held together in a uniquely 'reciprocal' dynamic.

In September 2007 Nepal's state-run airline confirmed that it had sacrificed two goats to appease Akash Bhairab, whose symbol is seen on the company's planes, following technical problems with one of its aircraft.

Gallery

References

External links

Forms of Shiva
Hindu temples in Kathmandu District